George Allen Marsden (28 June 1869 – 7 January 1938) was an English cricketer who played for Derbyshire County Cricket Club between 1894 and 1898.

Marsden was born in Wirksworth, the son of George Marsden a printer and auctioneer and his wife Anne Allen. In 1891 he was an articled law student.

Marsden started playing for  Derbyshire in the 1894 season and took part in several first-class games before they formally joined County Championship in the 1895 season. His debut in the championship was against Warwickshire in June 1895, which Derbyshire won by 200 runs, although Marsden's contribution was small. Marsden played regularly for the full 1896 season. He played one game in the 1897 season and three in the 1898 season. Marsden was a right-handed batsman and played 46 innings in 30 first-class matches with a top score of 37 and an average of 10.42. Although a leg-break bowler, he did not bowl in any first-class game.

Marsden died in Cape Province, South Africa, at the age of 68.

References

1869 births
1938 deaths
Derbyshire cricketers
English cricketers
People from Wirksworth
Cricketers from Derbyshire